The Athletics Association of Barbados (AAB) is the governing body for the sport of athletics in Barbados.

History 
AAB was founded in 1947 as Amateur Athletic Association of Barbados (AAAB), and was affiliated to the IAAF in 1966. In 2012, the name was changed to Athletics Association of Barbados.

Esther Maynard has been president of the association since 2004 and was re-elected in 2008. General Secretary Catherine Jordan assumed office in January 2013.

Affiliations 
AAB is the national member federation for Barbados in the following international organisations:
International Association of Athletics Federations (IAAF)
North American, Central American and Caribbean Athletic Association (NACAC)
Association of Panamerican Athletics (APA)
Central American and Caribbean Athletic Confederation (CACAC)
Moreover, it is part of the following national organisations:
Barbados Olympic Association (BOA)

National records 
AAB maintains the Barbadian records in athletics.

References

External links 
 

Barbados
Sports governing bodies in Barbados
Athletics in Barbados
1947 establishments in Barbados
Sports organizations established in 1947
National governing bodies for athletics